Gucheng Township (Mandarin: 古城回族乡) is a township in Ping'an District, Haidong, Qinghai, China. In 2010, Gucheng Township had a total population of 8,650: 4,470 males and 4,180 females: 2,017 aged under 14, 5,950 aged between 15 and 65 and 683 aged over 65.

References 

Ping'an District
Township-level divisions of Qinghai
Ethnic townships of the People's Republic of China